Burneston is a village and civil parish in the Hambleton district of North Yorkshire, England. According to the 2001 Census it had a population of 244, increasing to 311 at the 2011 Census.

History

The village is recorded in the Domesday Book as "Brennigston" and at the time was the property of Merleswein the Sheriff. The King passed ownership to Count Alan of Brittany, who made Robert of Moutiers the local landlord.

In 1591 the lordship was granted to Sir Richard Theakston by the Queen. It subsequently passed through the Pierse family of Bedale in 1639, the Wastell family in 1682, to eventually reside in 1830 with Matthew Montagu, 4th Baron Rokeby.

The old Roman road of Dere Street ran near the village and now follows the route of the A1(M).

The almshouses in Main Street, later partly used as a school, were built in 1680 and are Grade II* listed.

Governance

The village lies within the Richmond (Yorks) UK Parliamentary constituency. It is also in the Swale electoral division of North Yorkshire County Council. It forms part of the Leeming ward of Hambleton District Council which is represented by one councillor.

Geography

The nearest settlements are Theakston,  to the north; Carthorpe  to the south; Snape  to the west and Pickhill  to the east.
In the late nineteenth century the population was recorded as 253. According to the 2001 UK Census, the population of the village was 244 in 100 households, of which 196 were over sixteen years of age and 124 of those were in employment. There are 107 dwellings in total.

Community facilities

The village has one public house, The Woodman Inn, and a post office. The village is served by three school bus services, one that picks up primary school children from the surrounding area who attend the village school, and two that serve secondary pupils attending Bedale High School, Outwood Academy or Ripon Grammar School. There is one regular bus service that stops in the village on the Bedale to Ripon route.

Education

There is one school, the Burneston CE (Voluntary Aided) Primary School in the village. The school admits pupils from several of the nearby communities including Melmerby; Wath; Norton Conyers; East Tanfield; Middleton Quernhow; Sutton Howgrave; Kirklington; Carthorpe; Theakston and Exelby. Secondary education can be found at Bedale High School.

Religion

The village church is dedicated to St Lambert. It was built in three stages between 1395 and 1550 and is a Grade I listed building. Though the village is its own civil parish, it is also part of the ecumenically United Parish of Kirklington, Burneston, Wath and Pickhill.

Gallery

References

External links

Villages in North Yorkshire
Civil parishes in North Yorkshire